Väägvere is a village in Tartu Parish, Tartu County in Estonia.

Composer and double-bass player Ludvig Juht (1894–1957) was born in Väägvere.

References

Villages in Tartu County